Provincial elections were held in North-West Frontier Province to elect the members of the 9th Provincial Assembly of North-West Frontier Province on 18 February 2008, alongside nationwide general elections and three other provincial elections in Sindh, Balochistan and Punjab. The remaining two territories of Pakistan, AJK and Gilgit-Baltistan, were ineligible to vote due to their disputed status. These were the last elections held under the provincial name "North-West Frontier Province", later changed to Khyber Pakhtunkhwa following Eighteenth Amendment to the Constitution of Pakistan.

Results

References

Elections in Khyber Pakhtunkhwa
2008 elections in Pakistan
2008 in Pakistani politics